651 Antikleia is a main-belt asteroid discovered on 4 October 1907 by August Kopff at the Heidelberg-Königstuhl State Observatory. It is named for Anticlea the mother of Odysseus.
The name may have been inspired by the asteroid's provisional designation 1907 AN.

Antikleia is a member of the dynamic Eos family of asteroids that most likely formed as the result of a collisional breakup of a parent body.

References

External links
 
 

Eos asteroids
Antikleia
Antikleia
S-type asteroids (Tholen)
19071004